The Réseau Albert was a set of railway lines in France from 1889–1955, part of the Chemins de fer départementaux de la Somme. There were four lines in the Réseau Albert system:- Albert - Doullens, Albert - Ham, Fricourt - Montdidier and Offoy - Ercheu.

Background

In France, the building of railways was controlled by the Government. This avoided the duplication of routes that was seen in the United Kingdom and meant that the large cities and towns were connected. The citizens of the smaller towns and villages also wanted railways to be built to connect them to the network. The departments were given authority to oversee the construction of these minor lines, some of which were built to standard gauge and others were built to metre gauge or less. The Réseau Albert system came under the control of the Somme Department.

Albert - Doullens line
Doullens - Beauval on  15 November 1888, Beauval - Beauquesne on 14 February 1889 and Beauquesne - Albert on 3 August 1891. The line crossed the high ground between the Ancre and Authie rivers. The final section of line into Doullens was dual gauge, with the metre gauge rails laid inside the standard gauge rails of the Chemin de Fer du Nord's Amiens - Frévent à Gézaincourt line. An example of this method can be found on the Chemin de Fer de la Baie de Somme line.

During World War I, the line was in Allied hands. Before the Battle of the Somme in 1916, the line was truncated at Gézaincourt when the Standard gauge line of the Chemins de Fer du Nord was doubled. By October 1916, the line between Achuex-en-Amiénsois and Albert was disused. The section between Gézaincourt and Acheux-en-Amiénsois was used by the military, particularly for removing casualties from Acheux-en-Amiénsois to a casualty clearing station at Beauval. In preparation for the Battle of the Somme in 1916, branches were built from Martinsart to Aveluy, Thiepville Woods and Authuille to enable supplies of munitions to be brought up. Following the Battle of the Somme, the section of line between Acheux-en-Arménsois and Aveluy was converted to  gauge. The first train on this section ran on 12 February 1917. In April 1917, it was decided that the line between Albert and Doullens should be restored to Metre gauge. The conversion work was slow due to a number of factors, including the lack of suitable materials, the refusal of the French to supply material and a difference in priorities between the British and the French. The British made the recovery of materials for use on standard gauge lines their priority, whilst the French wanted the completion and opening of the line to be the first priority. By July 1917, the Société Générale des Chemins de Fer Economiques (SE), of which the Réseau Albert formed part, was running two trains per day between Acheux-en-Arménsois and Gézaincourt. These took 20 to 30 minutes longer than they had pre-war. During the German spring offensive in 1918, the SE service ceased on 21 March. The Acheux-en-Arménsois to Gézaincourt line was the only part of the Réseau Albert to remaine in Allied hands. The line was subsequently prepared for demolition lest it should fall into enemy hands.

The line between Albert and Gézaincourt had been restored to service by 1922. It was subsequently extended to Doullens, probably when the standard gauge line was singled post-war. By 1938, following the introduction of railcars, a certain amount of rationalisation took place on all lines. Some stations and halts were downgrade to arrêts. All freight facilities were withdrawn from arrêts and those trains that did call we by request only. The line closed to passengers on 1 July 1949 and also to freight north of Acheux at the same time. The section from Albert to Acheux closed to freight on 31 December 1949.

Stations
 A textile factory at Beauval was a source of freight for the railway.
 Albert -  datum point. Elevation . Station shared with Standard gauge lines from Amiens to Arras.
 Aveluy -  from Albert. An arrêt. Elevation .
 Martinsart -  from Albert. An arrêt. Elevation .
 Mesnil-Martinsart -  from Albert. A type 2 station. Elevation .
 Auchonvillers -  from Albert. An arrêt. Elevation .
 Mailly-Mallet -  from Albert. A type 2 station. Elevation .
 Bertroncourt -  from Albert. A halt. Elevation .
 Acheux-Varennes -  from Albert. A type 1 station. Elevation .
 Louvencourt -  from Albert. A type 2 station. Elevation .
 Vauchelles -  from Albert. A halt. Elevation .
 Raincheval-Arquèves -  from Albert. A type 2 station. Elevation .
 Beauquesne -  from Albert. A type 2 station. Elevation .
 Beauval -  from Albert. An type 2 station. Elevation . A tarpaulin factory was served. Phosphates were a source of traffic, brought in on a  gauge line for transhipment.
 Gezaincourt -  from Albert. A halt. Line joins standard gauge Amiens-Frévent line here. Elevation .
 Doullens -  from Albert. Shared with Standard gauge station. Elevation . A factory north east of the line to Frévent was served.

Albert - Ham line
The line between Péronne and Ham opened on 24 October 1889.

During the early part of World War I, the front line cut the line near Fricourt. The British did not use the line before the Battle of the Somme and it is believed the Germans did not use it either. The Allies had brought the line to Fricourt and beyond into use by October 1916. The British repaired the line from Albert south to Fricourt, and the French repaired the line north from Bray-sur-Somme, this section reopening on 14 July 1916. The line from Fricourt to Montauban and Trones Wood (between Monauban and Guillemont) was subsequently reopened. This section of line, from Albert to Trones Wood, was operated by the British. During 1917, the SE was ran a single train each day between Bray-sur-Somme and Montdidier. At some point, the line between Maurepas and Péronne-Flamicourt was converted to Standard gauge by the British. A  gauge line was laide alongside the standard gauge line, extending to Combles. In early 1918, the line between Péronne and Mons-en-Chausée, and also between Voyennes and Ham, was converted to  gauge. It is not known whether or not the SE ran trains at this time. The line was captured by the Germans during the Spring Offensive. A number of bridges were destroyed. The line was demolished in October 1918.

The line had been repaired and reopened to traffic by 31 December 1922. In November 1938, the line between Offoy and Ercheu was closed to passengers. Services were restored during World War II. The entire line closed on 31 December 1949.

Stations

 Albert – 0 kilometres (0 mi) datum point. Elevation . Station shared with Standard gauge lines from Amiens to Arras.
 Albert (halt) –  from Albert. A halt.
 Bécordel-Bécourt –  from Albert. An arrêt (halt).
 Fricourt –  from Albert. Elevation . A type 1 station, junction with line to Montdidier.
 Mametz –  from Albert. Elevation . A halt.
 Carnoy –  from Albert. An arrêt.
 Montauban –  from Albert. Elevation . A type 2 station.
 Guillemont-Longueval -  from Albert. Elevation . A type 2 station. There was a branch line which ran  to a sucrerie at Guillemont and then a further  to another at Longueval.
 Combles  –  from Albert. Elevation . A type 1 station.
 Maurepas –  from Albert. Elevation . A halt.
 Hem-Monacu –  from Albert. Elevation . A station.
 Feullières –  from Albert. Elevation . An arrêt.
 Cléry-sur-Somme –  from Albert. Elevation . A halt.
 Le Quinconce –  from Albert. An arrêt.
 Porte de Bretagne –  from Albert. A halt. A sucrerie was served.
 Péronne-Flamicourt –  from Albert. Elevation . Shared station on standard gauge Amiens-Cambrai line.
 Mesnil-Bruntel –  from Albert. Elevation . A halt.
 Mons-en-Chaussée –  from Albert. Elevation . A type 2 station.
 Athies –  from Albert. Elevation . A type 2 station.
 Devise –  from Albert. Elevation . A halt.
 Monchy-Lagache –  from Albert. Elevation . A type 2 station.
 Fletz-Douvieux –  from Albert. Elevation . An arrêt.
 Quivières –  from Albert. Elevation . A halt.
 Croix-Moligneaux –  from Albert. Elevation . An arrêt.
 Matigny –  from Albert. Elevation . A type 2 station.
 Offoy –  from Albert. Elevation . A type 1 station, junction with metre gauge line to Ercheu.
 Canisy –  from Albert. Elevation . An arrêt (halt).
 Ham –  from Albert. Elevation . Shared with station on standard gauge Amiens-Tergnier line. Junction with metre gauge line to Noyon. A sucrerie at Eppeville, near Ham, was served by the addition of a metre gauge siding to the existing standard gauge one.

Fricourt - Montdidier line
South of Bray, there were summits of  near Hangestand  near Fignières .

During the early part of World War I, prior to the Battle of the Somme, the line between Montdidier and Rosières-en-Santerre was used by the French Army. A third rail was  added to make this section dual gauge with a  gauge light railway. The line was disused north of Rosières-en-Santerre. A branch was built to serve the main headquarters of the French light railways in the Somme sector at Etelfray. The line was captured by the Germans during the Spring Offensive. A number of bridges were destroyed.

The line between Montdidier and Rosières-en-Santerre had been reopened by September 1921, with the line to Fricourt being reopened by 31 December. The entire line was closed to passengers, and to freight south of Froissy on 15 April 1948. The section to Froissy closed to freight on 31 December 1948.

Stations

 Fricourt -  from Albert. Elevation . A type 1 station, junction with line to Ham.
 Bray-sur-Somme-  from Albert. Elevation . A type 1 station.
 Froissy -  from Albert. Elevation . A halt. Transfer facility with the  gauge Chemin de Fer Froissy-Cappy-Dompierre. A branch line served a sucrerie.
 Chuignolles -  from Albert. Elevation . A halt.
 Proyart -  from Albert. Elevation . A type 2 station.
 Framerville -  from Albert. Elevation . An arrêt.
 Habronnièrers -  from Albert. Elevation . A type 2 station.
 Rosières-en-Santerre -  from Albert. Elevation . Shared with station on Standard gauge Amiens-Tergnier line.
 Rosières-Vrély -  from Albert. Elevation . An arrêt.
 Caix-Vrély -  from Albert. Elevation . A station.
Le Quesnel-Beaufort -  from Albert. Elevation . A station.
Bouchoir -  from Albert. Elevation . An arrêt.
Arvillers-Hangest -  from Albert. Elevation . A type 2 station.
Davenescourt -  from Albert. Elevation . A type 2 station.
Becquigny -  from Albert. Elevation . An arrêt.
Fignières -  from Albert. Elevation . A halt.
Montdidier halt-  from Albert. Elevation . An arrêt.
Montdidier -  from Albert. Elevation . Shared with station on Standard gauge Amiens-Compèigne line. Junction with Metre gauge line to Rollot and Noyon. In the 1920s, a bridge was constructed to enable the line to cross the Standard gauge line, replacing the earlier crossing on the level.

Offoy - Bussy line
This line laid behind the German front line during World War I. In February 1919, it was proposed that the line between Bussy and Ercheu should be reconstructed. SE signed an agreement with the préfet in April 1919. The line probably reopened on 1 October 1920, and the section between Ercheu and Offoy in September 1921. The line between Offoy and Ercheu closed on 1 July 1949. Ercheu to Bussy closed to passengers on 1 February 1954, An occasional freight service was operated until 31 December 1955. The last few kilometres of the line were in Oise.

Stations
Elevation . A type 1 station, junction with line to Ham.
 Voyennes -  from Ercheu. Elevation . A halt.
 Roue-le-Petit -  from Ercheu. Elevation . A station.
 Mesnil-Saint-Nicaise -  from Ercheu. Elevation . A type 2 station. Two sucreries were served, each by a separate branch.
 Nesle -  from Ercheu. Elevation . Shared with station on Standard gauge Amiens-Tergnier line. A distillerie adjacent to Nesle station was served by means of a dual gauge siding.
 Languevoisin -  from Ercheu. An arrêt.
 Breuil -  from Ercheu. An arrêt.
 Moyencourt -  from Ercheu. Elevation . A type 2 station.
 Ercheu -  datum point for line. Elevation . A type 1 station. a râperie' (sugar beet shredding plant) adjacent to the station was served.
 Ognolles -  from Ercheu. Elevation . A type 2 station.
 Beaulieu -  from Ercheu. An arrêt.
 Beaulieu-Ecuvilly -  from Ercheu. Elevation . A type 2 station. A sucrerie was served.
 Catigny -  from Ercheu. Elevation . A type 2 station.
 Sermaize -  from Ercheu. Elevation . A halt.
 Haudival -  from Ercheu. Elevation . A halt.
 Bussy -  from Ercheu. Elevation . A type 2 station Junction with Noyon-Ham line.

Station types
The stations on the Réseau Albert were classed according to their importance and the size of the location they served. A type 1 station had a main building with its ridge at right angles to the track, and a wing each side, one of which contained a goods hall. A type 2 station had a main building with its ridge at right angles to the track and smaller wings. A halt had just a main building. An arrêt had just a wood or brick shelter, if one was provided, with a rudimentary platform.

Rolling stock
Locomotives
The Société Générale des Chemins de Fer Economiques'' had at least 43 steam locomotives. In 1914, locomotives 3.524/25, 3.529-38, 3.540, 3.564, 3.566 and 3.571/72 were allocated to the Réseau Albert. Locomotive 3.571 was lost during World War I; 3.572 was captured by the Germans in 1916. It was recovered in 1922, repaired and returned to service.

Railcars
In 1925. two  Renault diesel railcars were put into service between Albert and Montdidier. Between 1936 and 1939, the SE introduced  De Dion-Bouton railcars on services from Albert. The NO type railcars were transferred from the Réseau de la Nièvre, which closed in 1939. By 1938, railcars were providing most of the passenger service on all lines except Offoy to Bussy.

Carriages
The Réseau Albert carriages were all bogie carriages, entered by end balconies. They were built by Decauville or Desouche & David. Carriages were mostly composite carriages (first, second and third class, first and second, first and third or second and third), with some all-thirds.

Goods wagons
The Réseau Albert had over 900 goods wagons.

References
Information on the French article has been used, based on translation by Freetranslation.com

Sources

Somme (department)
Metre gauge railways in France
Railway companies of France
Railway lines in Hauts-de-France
Oise
Battle of the Somme